The Virtual Museum of New France is a virtual museum created and managed by the Canadian Museum of History. Its purpose is to share knowledge and raise awareness of the history, culture and legacy of early French settlements in North America.

The site includes interactive maps, photos, illustrations and information based on current research into New France. This encompasses the French settlements and territories that spread from Acadia in the East through the Saint Lawrence Valley, the Great Lakes region, the Ohio Valley, and south to Louisiana from the 16th to the 18th centuries.

The content is written by historical and archaeological scholars  and reviewed by other experts.  Different sections are devoted to colonies and empires, explorers, economic activities, population, daily life and heritage.

The articles in the Virtual Museum of New France cover a variety of topics pertaining to New France, including important historical figures, territorial expansion by France and competing colonial powers, immigration, social groups, slavery, religion, food, entertainment, science, medicine and governance.

The site was launched in 1997 and expanded in 2011.

External links
 

Museums established in 1997
National museums of Canada
New France
1997 establishments in Canada

Canadian Museum of History Corporation